Club Deportivo Vicálvaro is a Spanish football team based in the Madrid district of Vicálvaro. Founded in 1928, it currently plays in Preferente, holding home matches at Estadio Municipal de Vicálvaro, which seats 2,250.

History
From 1987–97, Vicálvaro played nine years in national championships (Tercera División). In the 1991–92 season, it faced UE Figueres in the Spanish Cup. The Catalans were led by Jorge D'Alessandro, with future Olympic champion Toni Jiménez in goal (later of RCD Espanyol fame).

Subsequently, the club returned to the amateur leagues, even dropping down another level at the end of 2002–03 (promoting again immediately).

Season to season

12 seasons in Tercera División

Uniforms
First kit: Blue shirt, white shorts and white socks.
Alternative kit: White shirt, black shorts and black socks.

Stadium
Name: Municipal de Vicálvaro
Capacity: 2,250 spectators
Dimensions: 105 x 65

References

External links
Official website 
Futbolme team profile 
FutMadrid team profile 

Vicálvaro
Football clubs in Madrid
Association football clubs established in 1928
Divisiones Regionales de Fútbol clubs
1928 establishments in Spain